Shakeel Ivan is a Pakistani politician who was a Member of the Provincial Assembly of the Punjab, from May 2013 to May 2018.

Early life and education
He was born on 1 March 1968 in Sheikhupura.

He has received Intermediate level education.

Political career

He was elected to the Provincial Assembly of the Punjab as a candidate of Pakistan Muslim League (N) on reserved seat for minorities in 2013 Pakistani general election.

References

Living people
Punjab MPAs 2013–2018
Pakistan Muslim League (N) politicians
1968 births